Sculpture Mountain is a large dissected mountain between the Monument Nunataks and Sheehan Mesa. Named by the Northern Party of New Zealand Geological Survey Antarctic Expedition (NZGSAE), 1962–63, due to the cuspate embayment which has been sculptured into the feature.  The mountain is at the end of the Mesa Range and was renamed from Sculpture Tableland to the feature's current name when its status as a mountain was confirmed.

Cherry Spur forms the southwest portion of the mountain, while Tooth Peak is in the north face.

References

Mountains of Victoria Land
Pennell Coast